Oppy Mountain is located on the border of Alberta and British Columbia, North of the head of Lyell Creek. It was named in 1918 by interprovincial boundary surveyors after Oppy, a village in France. During World War I. the village had been captured by Germany in 1914. In May 1917, many Canadian soldiers were killed in the area during the Third Battle of the Scarpe.

Geology
Oppy Mountain is composed of sedimentary rock laid down from the Precambrian to Jurassic periods. Formed in shallow seas, this sedimentary rock was pushed east and over the top of younger rock during the Laramide orogeny.

Climate
Based on the Köppen climate classification, Oppy Mountain is located in a subarctic climate with cold, snowy winters, and mild summers.

See also
 List of peaks on the British Columbia–Alberta border
 List of mountains in the Canadian Rockies

References

Three-thousanders of Alberta
Three-thousanders of British Columbia
Canadian Rockies
Mountains of Banff National Park